Subordination (foaled May 24, 1994) is an American millionaire Thoroughbred racehorse who won major Graded stakes races in 1997 and 1998. Owned by Seth Klarman's Klaravich Stables and trained by Gary Sciacca, Subordination won on both dirt and turf racing surfaces.

Retired to stud, Subordination stands in at Montana Ranch in Uruguay.

References
 Subordination's pedigree and partial racing stats
 Video at YouTube of Subordination winning the 1998 Belmont Breeders' Cup Handicap

1994 racehorse births
Thoroughbred family 2-e
Racehorses bred in Kentucky
Racehorses trained in the United States